Robert Hayes Murray (July 4, 1898 – January 1, 1979) was a professional baseball player.  He was a third baseman for one season (1923) with the Washington Senators.  For his career, he compiled a .189 batting average in 37 at-bats, with two runs batted in.

An alumnus of Norwich University, he was born in St. Albans, Vermont and later died in Nashua, New Hampshire at the age of 80.

External links

1898 births
1979 deaths
Washington Senators (1901–1960) players
Major League Baseball third basemen
Baseball players from Vermont
Norwich Cadets baseball players
Worcester Busters players
Waterbury Nattatucks players
Worcester Boosters players
Rochester Tribe players
Nashville Vols players
Kansas City Blues (baseball) players
New Orleans Pelicans (baseball) players
Milwaukee Brewers (minor league) players
St. Paul Saints (AA) players
New Haven Profs players
Albany Senators players
Los Angeles Angels (minor league) players
Hollywood Stars players
Richmond Byrds players
Durham Bulls players
Springfield Ponies players
Dothan Boll Weevils players
Dothan Browns players
Tilton School alumni